Social cryptomnesia is a cognitive bias experienced by whole cultures following social change. Cryptomnesia is a failing of memory, usually referring to the mistaken belief that something the individual remembers is actually an original idea.  Social cryptomnesia is a failure to remember the origin of a change, in which people know that a change has occurred in society, but forget how this change occurred; that is, the steps that were taken to bring this change about, and who took these steps. This may lead to reduced social credit towards the minorities who made major sacrifices that led to the change in societal values. Social cryptomnesia is an extension of Moscovici's (1985) four stages of minority influence.

Women's rights 
The progress made in the first wave of feminism includes but is not limited to: healthcare, education, and the right to vote. These rights are considered to be just by the general population, yet the actions taken by the suffragettes (and suffragists) to get to this point are frequently ignored. Feminists are sometimes subject to negative stereotypes, and sometimes seen as extremists or radical. Furthermore, such negative stereotypes may prevent social change from occurring, even when people agree it is necessary. It may be possible to reduce these negative effects of social cryptomnesia by making individuals aware of how social cryptomnesia may contribute to their biases.

References 

Sociological terminology